Naughty Naughty is the third studio album by American singer Sinitta. It was released in 1995 only in Asia in its limited edition. The album contains pop covers of songs from the 1960s to the early 1980s.

Track listing
 "The Tide Is High" – 4:07
 "You Can't Hurry Love" – 3:55
 "Cuba" – 3:39
 "Club Tropicana" – 4:08
 "Hotel California" – 5:00
 "Naughty Naughty" – 3:31
 "Shame, Shame, Shame" – 3:53
 "Where Did Our Love Go" – 4:16
 "Never Knew Love Like This Before" – 3:30
 "You Really Got Me" – 3:05
 "Naughty Naughty (Brand New Heavies Mix)"

Notes
 "Shame Shame Shame" is originally by Shirley & Company
 "Where Did Our Love Go" is originally by The Supremes
 "Stop in the Name of Love" is originally by The Supremes
 "You Can't Hurry Love" is originally by The Supremes
 "Remember Me" is originally by Diana Ross
 "The Tide Is High" is originally by The Paragons
 "Never Knew Love Like This Before" is originally by Stephanie Mills
 "Hotel California" is originally by The Eagles
 "Cuba" is originally by Gibson Brothers
 "Club Tropicana" is originally by Wham!
 "You Really Got Me" is originally by The Kinks

References

1995 albums
Sinitta albums
Covers albums